The 2019 SuperUtes Series (known for commercial reasons as the 2019 ECB SuperUtes Series) was the second running of the series. The season started at the Adelaide Street Circuit on March 1 and concluded at Newcastle Street Circuit on November 24.

Teams and drivers

Driver Changes 

 Cameron Crick Competed full time, after competing in 2 rounds in 2018

Team Changes 

 Ross Stone Racing switched from running a Holden Colorado to an Isuzu D-Max.

Calendar

Calendar Changes 

 Barbagallo Raceway was added as the second event of the season
 The round at Sandown was dropped for 2019

Series standings

Notes

References

External links
 

SuperUte Series